The U.S. state of Indiana has 24 state parks maintained and operated by Indiana Department of Natural Resources (DNR). In addition, a separate state agency operates White River State Park in downtown Indianapolis. Marion and Clark are the only counties to have two parks. Brown County, the largest state park, has the greatest number of visitors, followed by Indiana Dunes State Park.

Richard Lieber was instrumental in the foundation of the Indiana State Park system. The first state park in Indiana was McCormick's Creek State Park, in Owen County in 1916, followed in the same year by Turkey Run State Park in Parke County. The number of state parks rose steadily in the 1920s, mostly by donations of land from local authorities to the state government. Of the initial twelve parks, only Muscatatuck State Park is no longer a state park, having been given back to Jennings County in 1968. It was during the Great Depression of the 1930s that much infrastructure was built within the parks, constructed by New Deal agencies such as the Civilian Conservation Corps and the Works Progress Administration, with the majority of this Depression-era construction still in use in the 21st century. This delay in infrastructure was due in part to Richard Lieber's belief that the parks should be kept as natural as possible.

Initially, the state parks were intended to feature natural environments in Indiana. The establishment of Mounds State Park for its historical nature and Shakamak State Park (an abandoned strip mine) purely for recreational purposes represented changes from the initial purposes of the Indiana state park system.

While Indiana does not have as many state parks as some other states, it has avoided obtaining too many smaller properties that would be hard to manage. A goal of having at least one state park within an hour's drive for every Hoosier was met when Prophetstown State Park was established in 2004.

It is possible to view the Milky Way at 3 of the 24 Indiana State Parks, which are  Shades State Park, Tippecanoe River State Park, and Turkey Run State Park.

State parks

See also
List of Indiana state forests
List of National Parks of the United States

References

External links

Indiana Department of Natural Resources Division of State Parks and Reservoirs

 
Indiana state parks
State parks